Fiona Campbell may refer to:

Fiona Campbell (cricketer), Scottish cricketer
Fiona Campbell (alpine skier), British alpine skier
Fiona Kumari Campbell, disability studies researcher and theorist
Fiona Campbell-Walter, British model